Martin Fabi (November 1, 1942 – January 5, 2023) was a professional Canadian football player. After his father was killed in World War II, the family fled to Austria in 1944. In 1953, Fabi and his family immigrated to Ontario, Canada, where they settled in the town of Aylmer.

In 1962, Fabi began playing in the Canadian Football League (CFL) with the Montreal Alouettes. He was traded to the Saskatchewan Roughriders in 1963 and played for Saskatchewan till 1965. He was a split end who also punted for the Roughriders. He holds the league records for most punting yards and most punts in a game. His records are 18 punts totalling 814 yards at Calgary on September 14, 1963. His son, Randy Fabi, also played in the CFL for the Winnipeg Blue Bombers and Hamilton Tiger-Cats.

Notes

1942 births
2023 deaths
Transylvanian Saxon people
Romanian emigrants to Canada
Canadian football wide receivers
Montreal Alouettes players
Saskatchewan Roughriders players
People from Bistrița-Năsăud County